{{safesubst:#invoke:RfD||2=The Catholic Answer|month = March
|day =  1
|year = 2023
|time = 18:39
|timestamp = 20230301183932

|content=
REDIRECT Our Sunday Visitor

}}